The Bryan Hose House, in Idaho Springs, Colorado, was built in 1881.  It was listed on the National Register of Historic Places in 1998.

It has also been known as the Sunnyside Hose House and as Hose Company No. 2.  It is located at the junction of Illinois and Virginia Streets in Idaho Springs.

See also  
 Hose House No. 2 (Idaho Springs, Colorado)
 National Register of Historic Places listings in Clear Creek County, Colorado

References

Fire stations on the National Register of Historic Places in Colorado
National Register of Historic Places in Clear Creek County, Colorado
Victorian architecture in Colorado
Fire stations completed in 1881
1881 establishments in Colorado